The 1972–73 New Zealand rugby union tour of the Britain, Ireland, France and North America was a collection of rugby union test match games undertaken by the All Blacks against England, Scotland, Wales, Ireland and France. The tour also took in several matches against British, Irish, French and North American club, county and invitational teams. This was the seventh tour of the Northern Hemisphere. It was also the first time the All Blacks lost to the invitational Barbarians team.

In the club matches, the team only lost to Llanelli, North-Western Counties, Midland Counties (West), and the Barbarians, and drew with Munster. In the tests played the team won against Wales, Scotland and England, drew with Ireland and lost to France. This was their fifth "Grand Slam tour" after 1905–06 (Lost to Wales), 1935–36 (Lost to Wales and England), 1953–54 (Lost to Wales), 1963–64 (Drew with Scotland). They had to wait until 1978 for a "Grand Slam".

Touring party
Manager: Ernie Todd
Assistant Manager: Bob Duff
Captain: Ian Kirkpatrick

Backs
Joe Karam (Wellington)
Trevor Morris (Nelson-Bays)
Bryan Williams (Auckland)
Grant Batty (Wellington)
Duncan Hales (Canterbury)
George Skudder (Waikato)
Bruce Robertson (Counties)
Ian Hurst (Canterbury)
Mike Parkinson (Poverty Bay)
Mark Sayers (Wellington)
Bob Burgess (Manawatu)
Ian Stevens (Wellington)
Sid Going (North Auckland)
Lin Colling (Otago)

Forwards
Alan Sutherland (Marlborough)
Alex Wyllie (Canterbury)
Bevan Holmes (North Auckland)
Ian Kirkpatrick (Poverty Bay)
Ken Stewart (Southland)
Alistair Scown (Taranaki)
Hamish Macdonald (Canterbury)
Ian Eliason (Taranaki)
Andy Haden (Auckland)
Peter Whiting (Auckland)
Keith Murdoch (Otago)
Jeff Matheson (Otago)
Kent Lambert (Manawatu)
Graham Whiting (King Country)
Ron Urlich (Auckland)
Tane Norton (Canterbury)
Lindsay Clark (Otago), replacement during tour
Sandy McNicol (Wanganui), replacement during tour

Tour itinerary

Test matches

Wales

Scotland

England

Ireland

France

Non-International Matches
Scores and results list New Zealand's points tally first.

Barbarians

See also
 End-of-year rugby union internationals

References

New Zealand tour
New Zealand tour
1972-73
1972-73
1972-73
1972-73
1972-73
1972-73
1972-73
1972-73
1972-73
1972 in New Zealand rugby union
1973 in New Zealand rugby union
1972–73 in English rugby union
1972–73 in Welsh rugby union
1972–73 in Scottish rugby union
1972–73 in French rugby union
1972–73 in Irish rugby union
1972–73 in European rugby union
New Zealand tour
New Zealand tour
New Zealand tour